Kim Dan-bi (김단비  born 27 February 1990) is a South Korean professional basketball player.

Career

WKBL
In 2007, Kim began her professional career with the Incheon Shinhan Bank S-Birds for the 2007–08 season. Kim has since been a strong, consistent member of the S-Birds roster. In her early years, Kim was a part of a five-year streak of championships. During her time, she has also been awarded a place on the Best 5 team on three occasions.

National Team

Youth level
Kim made her international debut at the 2007 FIBA Under-19 World Championship in Slovakia, where South Korea placed eighth.

Senior level
Kim made her debut with the senior national team, at the 2010 FIBA World Championship for Women in the Czech Republic. Kim has since been a constant member of the Korean national team, particularly at the Asian Games and Asian Championships. In 2010, Kim took home the silver in the Asian Games, then in 2014, in her home city of Incheon, South Korea won the gold. At the Asia Cup, in both 2011 and 2013, Kim earned a silver medal at the tournament, whilst taking home the bronze in 2015.

References

External links

South Korean women's basketball players
Forwards (basketball)
1990 births
Living people
Asian Games gold medalists for South Korea
Asian Games silver medalists for South Korea
Asian Games medalists in basketball
Sportspeople from Incheon
Medalists at the 2010 Asian Games
Medalists at the 2014 Asian Games
Basketball players at the 2010 Asian Games
Basketball players at the 2014 Asian Games
Basketball players at the 2020 Summer Olympics
Olympic basketball players of South Korea